Syd Vanderpool (born September 23, 1972) is a professional boxing coach and held the NABO (North American Boxing Organization) (super middleweight) title; he was ranked #1 in the world in 2004 by the International Boxing Federation.

Career
Vanderpool fought world champions Bernard Hopkins and Jeff Lacey, and had a victory over Glen Johnson.

After retiring from competitive boxing in May 2005 with a professional record of 35 wins and 4 losses with 23 ko's, Vanderpool became the CEO of the Boxing By Syd Athletic Centre in Kitchener.  The youngest of five brothers, Vanderpool was encouraged by his father, who build a full size boxing ring in their backyard. According to Vanderpool, success is not about how great of a boxer one can be, but is measured by the quality of meaningful relationships acquired while working toward a goal.

Personal life
Syd has three children, Alexus, Destini and Jaelen, with his wife Michelle whom he has been married to since 2002.
Syd also runs a successful boxing gym called SydFit, where he trains many young and old boxers, teaches fitness classes and continues to create a culture of Champions.

Professional boxing record

References

Black Canadian boxers
Canadian male boxers
Canadian boxing trainers
Sportspeople from Kitchener, Ontario
Living people
1972 births
Super-middleweight boxers